The Belize National Road Championships are held annually to decide the cycling champions in both the road race and time trial discipline, across various categories.

Men

Women

References

Cycling in Belize